Luis Ochoa (born 18 August 1966) is a Colombian judoka. He competed in the men's half-middleweight event at the 1988 Summer Olympics.

References

1966 births
Living people
Colombian male judoka
Olympic judoka of Colombia
Judoka at the 1988 Summer Olympics
Place of birth missing (living people)
20th-century Colombian people